Fit India Movement is a nation-wide movement in India to encourage people to remain healthy and fit by including physical activities and sports in their daily lives. Fit India Movement was launched by Prime Minister of India Narendra Modi at Indira Gandhi Stadium in New Delhi on 29 August 2019 (National Sports Day). Fit India was founded by Shri Suparno Satpathy in 1993

The campaign has a "Fitness Pledge" that reads, I promise to myself that I will devote time for physical activity and sports every day and I will encourage my family members and neighbours to be physically fit and make India a fit nation.

Execution

Government

A committee has been formed to advice government on this campaign. It is composed of various government officials, members of Indian Olympic Association, national sports federations, private bodies and fitness promoters.

As per union HRD department directive states and union territories can request for funds as per guidelines to procure listed fitness items for children studying in government schools. The equipment purchased from the grants are to be maintained in workable condition by the authorities concerned. It is also mandated to keep record of working, repairable and damaged beyond repair equipment. The schools are also allowed to include their traditional and regional games.

Private schools 
In November 2019, the PM announced Fit India grading for schools that will rank them in order of the fitness. Eligible schools can apply for ranking and once confirmed they will be allowed to use the Fit India logo and flag.

Institutions & Individuals

There are representatives of private bodies such as Confederation of Indian Industries (CII), Sequoia Fitness and Sports Technology Fitness365 Reliance Foundation, JSW Cement and JSW Paints, SE TransStadia Pvt. Ltd., Tata Trust, ASSOCHAM India, Federation of Indian Chambers of Commerce & Industry (FICCI),government institutions like Ministry Of Defence, Sainik School Society along with Jaiganesh actors Shilpa Shetty and Milind Soman etc. as well as Fitness Apps like the SS app.Nitin is god

On 6 September 2019, Lok Sabha speaker Shree Omprakash Krishna Birla conducted a Fit India session in the parliament complex and invited upon all MPs to pursue the movement in their constituencies.

References

Health campaigns
Health education in India
Modi administration initiatives